The Congress of Polonia in Germany (Polish: Kongres Polonii Niemieckiej, German: Polnischer Kongress in Deutschland e.V.) is a national umbrella organisation, representing Poles in Germany.

See also
 Polonia

External links
  http://www.kongres.org/

Polish diaspora organizations
Germany–Poland relations
Polish minority in Germany